Rattray (historic: Rettre; occasionally: Rattery; Scottish Gaelic: Raitear), (found at ) had been settled as far back as 4000 BC and was named a Royal Burgh in 1564 by Mary, Queen of Scots, "to put an end to the disputes about superiority over it between William Keith, 4th Earl Marischal and George Hay, 7th Earl of Erroll". The ancient burgh was located near to Crimond, but the village was largely destroyed and never recovered after a storm in the 18th century that covered it in shifting sands from the nearby dunes at Rattray Head. However, there is still a small modern settlement in the area.

Features 
The nearby lagoon, Strathbeg Bay (also known as Strathbeg Water or Water of Rattray), had been an "open estuary which was navigable to trading ships"  suiting itself to Starny Keppie harbour around which Rattray flourished. However, by 1654, the harbour was silting up badly and was finally cut off when shifting sands during a massive 1720 storm cut off the lagoon to form Loch Strathbeg, "trapping a small vessel laden with slates", which were subsequently used for the roofs in Crimond and Haddo House.

The harbour was guarded by two of the Nine Castles of Knuckle. The Comyn family's Castle of Rattray stood on Castlehill (at the time a rock on the coast) on the harbour side and Lonmay Castle.

Still clearly visible today, the ruined St Mary's Chapel was built as a private place of worship by the Comyn family at the same time as the construction of the Castle of Rattray.

St Fergus Church, dating to 1868, is the work of architect James Matthews. Its bellcote (1644) was retrieved from the old kirk (a mile to the east on the links), which was abandoned in 1616. Its 1751 churchyard wall remains, including an arched gate, a morthouse and several gravestones.

To the west of Rattray on the banks of Loch Strathbeg is the historical site Battle Fauld. The name most likely comes from the "scene of a conflict with the Danes in the time of their later invasions." Indeed, the same source explains that the local dialect and pronunciation (in 1888) used words that "are good Danish or Norwegian" and calls the type of language features used as "thoroughly Norse" to anyone "who knows anything about the Norse family of speech".

The ballad Sir James the Rose was set in Battle Fauld where he is supposedly buried.

See also
HMS Merganser (otherwise RNAS Rattray)

References

External links

Rattray Head Lighthouse history
Web Historian Rattray Lighthouse
Web Historians Guide to Rattray
Rattray and other places in NE Scotland deserted as a result of shifting sand

Villages in Aberdeenshire
Former populated places in Scotland